Öküzgözü (Kurdish: Çavga or Tiriyê Çavga) is a grape variety and a Turkish wine produced from this grape. The grape is one of the two native grape varieties of Elazığ Province (the other one is Boğazkere), located on the Anatolian plateau at the north of the Taurus Mountains. The various sources of the Euphrates River in this region soften the normally harsh climate of Eastern Turkey.

Öküzgözü has rounded, dark colored grapes, which are the largest among the grape varieties grown in Turkey. The Turkish word öküzgözü literally means "ox eye".

See also
 Boğazkere
 Çalkarası
 Kalecik Karası
 Papazkarası

References

Grape varieties of Turkey
Turkish words and phrases
Red wine grape varieties